Virgill Najoe (born 18 July 1988) is a Surinamese professional footballer who plays as a striker for SVB Eerste Divisie club Broki.

International career 
Najoe made his debut for Suriname in a 2–0 friendly win against Bonaire on 14 November 2013. Several days later, he scored his first two international goals, both in a friendly against Curaçao, as Suriname was victorious 3–1.

International goals 
Suriname score listed first, score column indicates score after each Najoe goal.

References 

1988 births
Living people
Sportspeople from Paramaribo
Association football forwards
SVB Eerste Divisie players
S.V. Excelsior players
S.V. Broki players

Suriname international footballers
Surinamese footballers